Élan Béarnais Pau-Lacq-Orthez, also known as simply Élan Béarnais , and formerly known as Élan Béarnais Pau-Orthez, is a French professional basketball club that is based in Pau. They compete in the top-tier French league, the Betclic ELITE. They are one of the most successful clubs in French basketball history, as they have won nine French League championships and have had European-wide successes as well.

History

The Élan Béarnais was founded in 1931 in the town of Orthez in Pyrénées-Atlantiques in the southwest of France. The club first reached the top level of French professional basketball in 1973.  They were immediately relegated back to the second division, but returned to the top flight in 1976.  The club then made their European debut one year later, in 1977, by qualifying for the FIBA Korać Cup.  Their ascent continued by winning the FIBA Korać Cup in 1984, defeating Crvena zvezda in the final in Paris (Palais des sports Pierre-de-Coubertin).  This was the first of many pieces of silverware that would be added to the club's trophy cabinet over the next two decades.

More success followed as the Élan Béarnais were finally crowned champions of France for the first time, winning back-to-back titles in 1986 and 1987.  This earned them entry into the FIBA European Champions' Cup (present-day Euroleague).  Despite their status as newcomers, they were anything but intimidated, completing their maiden campaign of 1986-87 with a shock 3rd-place finish and a perfect record at home.  It was a magical run, as they defeated European giants or traditional clubs of European basketball like Žalgiris, Maccabi Tel Aviv, Real Madrid, Zadar and that season's champions, Tracer Milano, on their home court, La Moutète.  The Élan Béarnais would remain a fixture in European competition every season thereafter, until 2008, setting a European longevity record of 31 years in the process (1977–2008).

As this humble club from a village of 12,000 people at the foot of the Pyrénées blossomed into a power of European basketball, a move to a bigger city became necessary.  The club changed its name in 1989, becoming the Élan Béarnais Pau-Orthez, and moved to the city of Pau, after the inauguration of the Palais des Sports in 1991.  This move was made possible by the visionary efforts of two men: Pierre Seillant, the beloved longtime president of the club, and André Labarrère, then-mayor of Pau.  Thanks to them, the Palais (still today the largest basketball-centric arena in France) was built, and the Élan were able to remain in their home region of Béarn.

With the relocation complete, the club carried on cementing their status as the dominant force of French basketball, winning seven more league championships over the next thirteen years.  The club's total of nine championships ranks them third behind ASVEL and Limoges for the most of any team in the history of French professional basketball.  The last one came in 2004, the second of back-to-back titles, and was the culmination of a golden-age for the club.  The previous season, 2003, was arguably the most spectacular in the history of Pau-Orthez, when the breathtaking abilities of two homegrown, young talents named Boris Diaw and Mickaël Piétrus spearheaded the Élan Béarnais to a sweep of all three French trophies (Le Championnat, Coupe de France and Semaine des As).  Diaw's campaign won him the League MVP award for French players, and following the season both he and Pietrus were drafted in the first round of the 2003 NBA Draft.

Unfortunately, due to exodus of talent, a lack of coaching stability, and financial problems, the success of the club steadily waned from 2004 on, until rock-bottom was reached and the previously unthinkable happened: in 2009, the Élan Béarnais were relegated to the LNB Pro B after finishing in last place.  It was their first stint in the second division since 1976.  This disappointment was used as an opportunity to re-structure and re-strengthen the club, but although they earned immediate promotion back to the Pro A in 2010, their struggles continued, and they were relegated for a second time in 2012.  However, the Élan once again wasted no time in climbing directly back to the top-flight, and in the 2013-14 season they narrowly missed out on qualifying for the playoffs for the first time since 2006.  With club-legend Didier Gadou entrenched as the General Manager, and former title-winning head-coach Claude Bergeaud back at the helm on the sideline, the future is bright once-again for this proud club.  They remain in a tussle for a playoff berth halfway through the 2014-15 season.

In 2008, the club underwent a minor name-change for the second time in their history, becoming the Élan Béarnais Pau-Lacq-Orthez. The city of Lacq's inclusion in the name and entrance onto the director's board strengthened the club's Béarn identity.  For their part, Lacq, located just north-west of Pau, now provides funding to the club.

Arena

Pau-Orthez play their home games at the Palais des Sports de Pau since 1991, which has a seating capacity of 7,707 people.

At Orthez, the club played their home games at La Moutète.

Rivalries
The Élan Béarnais' biggest rival is Limoges CSP, another legendary French club, and they have been trading blows with one another for national supremacy on the hardwood, both figuratively and literally, since the early 1980s.  In the 22 seasons between 1983 and 2004, the two clubs combined for 18 championships, and multiple games between the two teams resulted in fights amongst the players, including one that ended in a brawl between Élan supporters and Limoges players at their old Orthez venue, La Moutète.  ASVEL is also a fierce rival of the Élan Béarnais, and games against both of these teams are referred to as the "Clasicos" of French basketball, receiving tremendous hype from the media and fans.

Players

Retired numbers

Current roster

Notable players

FIBA Hall of Famers

Honours
Total titles: 19

Domestic competitions
 French League
 Winners (9): 1985–86, 1986–87, 1991–92, 1995–96, 1997–98, 1998–99, 2000–01, 2002–03, 2003–04
 Runners-up (4): 1988–89, 1992–93, 1994–95, 2001–02
 French Cup
 Winners (4): 2001–02, 2002–03, 2006–07, 2021-22
 Runners-up (2): 2000–01, 2003–04
 Leaders Cup
 Winners (4): 1990–91, 1991–92, 1992–93, 2002-03
 French Super Cup
 Winners (1): 2007

European competitions
 EuroLeague
 3rd place (1): 1986–87
 FIBA Korać Cup (defunct)
 Winners (1): 1983–84
 Semifinalists (1): 1994–95
 European Super Cup (semi-official, defunct)
 Runners-up (1): 1984

Season by season

In European and worldwide competitions

The road to the 1983–84 FIBA Korać Cup victory

Kit manufacturer
2017-2021: PEAK
2021-2022: Adidas
2022-: Hummel

Difficulties 
in  2022, a scandal escalated since Taqwa Pinero, a former player, then appointed CEO and General  Manager had been brutally dismissed for a reason related to his religion. Indeed, according to Sud-Ouest newspaper, Taqwa Pinero was notified in early August of his dismissal as manager of Elan Béarnais, the Pau basketball club, “for having displayed his Muslim faith on the social networks”. According to the same source, the mayor of Pau, François Bayrou, would have pressured the owners of the club to oust Taqwa Pinero.

References

External links
 Official website

Basketball teams established in 1908
Pau
Sport in Pau, Pyrénées-Atlantiques